2012 census may refer to:

Alberta municipal censuses, 2012
2012 Bolivian census
2012 Zimbabwe census